Feilde is an English surname. Notable people with the surname include:

 Edmund Feilde (1620–1676), British barrister and politician
 Paul Feilde (1711–1783), British lawyer and politician

See also
 Feild
 Adele M. Fielde (1839–1916)

English-language surnames